...Featuring Norah Jones is a compilation album by American singer Norah Jones that was released on November 16, 2010, by Blue Note Records. The album includes songs by other artists on which Jones is featured, including songs by her side bands The Little Willies and El Madmo. The album includes "Here We Go Again", a duet with Ray Charles, which won the Grammy Award for Record of the Year in 2005. The song "Little Lou, Ugly Jack, Prophet John" by Belle & Sebastian had only been released one month prior to the release of this album on the group's October 2010 album Belle and Sebastian Write About Love.

Track listing

Charts

Weekly charts

Year-end charts

Certifications

References

External links
 

2010 compilation albums
Blue Note Records compilation albums
Norah Jones compilation albums
EMI Records compilation albums